Ezekiel or Ezechiel (Yəḥezqēʾl ; in the Septuagint written in   ) is the central protagonist of the Book of Ezekiel in the Hebrew Bible.

In Judaism, Christianity, and Islam, Ezekiel is acknowledged as a Hebrew prophet. In Judaism and Christianity, he is also viewed as the 6th-century BCE author of the Book of Ezekiel, which reveals prophecies regarding the destruction of Jerusalem, and the restoration to the land of Israel.

The name Ezekiel means "God is strong" or "God strengthens".

In the Bible 
The author of the Book of Ezekiel presents himself as Ezekiel, the son of Buzi, born into a priestly (kohen) lineage. Apart from identifying himself, the author gives a date for the first divine encounter which he presents: "in the thirtieth year". Ezekiel describes his calling to be a prophet by going into great detail about his encounter with God and four "living creatures" with four wheels that stayed beside the creatures.

Living in Babylon 
According to the Bible, Ezekiel and his wife lived during the Babylonian captivity on the banks of the Chebar River, in Tel Abib, with other exiles from Judah. There is no mention of him having any offspring.

Chronology 
Ezekiel's "thirtieth year" is given as the fifth year of the exile of Judah's king Jehoiachin by the Babylonians, counting the years after the exile in 598 BCE, that is from 597 to 593 BCE. The last recorded prophecy of Ezekiel dates to April 571 BCE, sixteen years after the destruction of Jerusalem in 587 BCE. On the basis of dates given in the Book of Ezekiel, his span of prophecies can be calculated to have occurred over the course of about 22 years, starting in 593 BCE.

The Aramaic Targum on Ezekiel 1:1 and the 2nd-century rabbinic work Seder Olam Rabba (chapter 26) both say that Ezekiel's vision came "in the thirtieth year after Josiah was presented with a Book of the Law discovered in the Temple", the  latter taking place about the time of Josiah's reforms in 622 BCE, shortly after the call of Jeremiah to prophetic ministry around 626 BCE. If the "thirtieth year" of Ezekiel 1:1 instead refers to Ezekiel's age, then he was born around 622 BCE and was fifty years old when he had his final vision.

Extrabiblical traditions

Jewish tradition 

According to Jewish tradition, Ezekiel did not write his own book, the Book of Ezekiel, but rather his prophecies were collected and written by the Men of the Great Assembly.

Ezekiel, like Jeremiah, is said by Talmud and Midrash to have been a descendant of Joshua by his marriage with the proselyte and former prostitute Rahab. Some statements found in rabbinic literature posit that Ezekiel was the son of Jeremiah, who was (also) called "Buzi" because he was despised by the Jews.

Ezekiel was said to be already active as a prophet while in the Land of Israel, and he retained this gift when he was exiled with Jehoiachin and the nobles of the country to Babylon. Josephus claims that Nebuchadnezzar of Babylonia's armies exiled three thousand Jews from Judah, after deposing King  Jehoiachin in 598 BCE.

Rava states in the Babylonian Talmud that although Ezekiel describes the appearance of the throne of God (merkabah), this is not because he had seen more than the prophet Isaiah, but rather because the latter was more accustomed to such visions; for the relation of the two prophets is that of a courtier to a peasant, the latter of whom would always describe a royal court more floridly than the former, to whom such things would be familiar. Ezekiel, like all the other prophets, has beheld only a blurred reflection of the divine majesty, just as a poor mirror reflects objects only imperfectly.

According to the midrash Canticles Rabbah, it was Ezekiel whom the three pious men, Hananiah, Mishael, and Azariah (also called Shadrach, Meshach, and Abednego in the Bible) asked for advice as to whether they should resist Nebuchadnezzar's command and choose death by fire rather than worship his idol. At first God revealed to the prophet that they could not hope for a miraculous rescue; whereupon the prophet was greatly grieved, since these three men constituted the "remnant of Judah". But after they had left the house of the prophet, fully determined to sacrifice their lives to God, Ezekiel received this revelation: "Thou dost believe indeed that I will abandon them. That shall not happen; but do thou let them carry out their intention according to their pious dictates, and tell them nothing".

Christian tradition 

Ezekiel is commemorated as a saint in the liturgical calendar of the Eastern Orthodox Church—and those Eastern Catholic Churches which follow the Byzantine Rite—on July 21 (for those churches which use the traditional Julian Calendar, July 21 falls on August 5 of the modern Gregorian Calendar). Ezekiel is commemorated on August 28 on the Calendar of Saints of the Armenian Apostolic Church, and on April 10 in the Roman Martyrology.

Certain Lutheran churches also celebrate his commemoration on July 21.

Saint Bonaventure interpreted Ezekiel's statement about the "closed gate" as a prophecy of the Incarnation: the "gate" signifying the Virgin Mary and the "prince" referring to Jesus. This is one of the readings at Vespers on Great Feasts of the Theotokos in the Eastern Orthodox and Byzantine Catholic Churches. This imagery is also found in the traditional Catholic Christmas hymn "Gaudete" and in a saying by Bonaventure, quoted by Alphonsus Maria de' Liguori: "No one can enter Heaven unless by Mary, as though through a door." The imagery provides the basis for the concept that God gave Mary to humanity as the "Gate of Heaven" (thence the dedication of churches and convents to the Porta Coeli), an idea also laid out in the Salve Regina (Hail Holy Queen) prayer.

John B. Taylor credits the subject with imparting the Biblical understanding of the nature of God.

Islamic tradition 

Ezekiel ("Ḥazqiyāl") is recognized as a prophet in Islamic tradition. Although not mentioned by name in the Quran, Muslim scholars, both classical and modern have included Ezekiel in lists of the prophets of Islam.

The Quran mentions a prophet called Dhū al-Kifl. Although Dhu al-Kifl's identity is disputed, he is often identified with Ezekiel. Carsten Niebuhr, in his Reisebeschreibung nach Arabian, says he visited Al Kifl in Iraq, midway between Najaf and Hilla and said Kifl was the Arabic form of Ezekiel. He further explained in his book that Ezekiel's Tomb was present in Al Kifl and that the Jews came to it on pilgrimage. The name "Dhu al-Kifl" means "Possessor of the Double" or "Possesor of the Fold" ( dhū "possessor of, owner of" and  al-kifl "double, folded"). Some Islamic scholars have likened Ezekiel's mission to the description of Dhu al-Kifl. When the exile, monarchy, and state were annihilated, a political and national life was no longer possible. In the absence of a worldly foundation it became necessary to build a spiritual one and Ezekiel performed this mission by observing the signs of the time and deducing his doctrines from them. In conformity with the two parts of his book, his personality and his preaching are alike twofold.

Regardless of the identification of Dhu al-Kifl with Ezekiel, Muslims have viewed Ezekiel as a prophet. Ezekiel appears in all Muslim collections of Stories of the Prophets. Muslim exegesis further lists Ezekiel's father as Buzi (Budhi) and Ezekiel is given the title ibn al-‘ajūz, denoting "son of the old (man)", as his parents are supposed to have been very old when he was born. A tradition, which resembles that of Hannah and Samuel in the Hebrew Bible, states that Ezekiel's mother prayed to God in old age for the birth of an offspring and was given Ezekiel as a gift from God.

Bibliography 
 Ibn Kutayba, K. al-Ma'arif ed. S. Ukasha, 51
 Tabari, History of the Prophets and Kings, 2, 53–54
 Tabari, Tafsir, V, 266 (old ed. ii, 365)
 Masudi, Murudj, i, 103ff.
 K. al-Badwa l-tarikh, iii, 4/5 and 98/100, Ezechiel
 Abdullah Yusuf Ali, Holy Qur'an: Translation and Commentary, Note. 2473 (cf. index: Ezekiel)
 Emil Heller Henning III, "Ezekiel's Temple: A Scriptural Framework Illustrating the Covenant of Grace", 2012.

Purported tombs

Al Kifl 
The tomb of Ezekiel is a structure located in modern-day south Iraq near Kefil, believed to be the final resting place of Ezekiel. It has been a place of pilgrimage to both Muslims and Jews alike. After the Jewish exodus from Iraq, Jewish activity in the tomb ceased, although a disused synagogue remains in place.

Ergani 
A tomb in the Ergani district of Diyarbakır Province, Turkey, is also believed to be the resting place of prophet Ezekiel. It is located 5 km from the city centre on a hill, revered and visited by the local Muslims, called Makam Dağı.

In popular culture 
Ezekiel is portrayed by Darrell Dunham in a 1979 episode of the television series Our Jewish Roots (1978-).

See also 
 Apocryphon of Ezekiel
 Pseudo-Ezekiel
 List of names referring to El

Notes

References

Further reading 

Kugler, Gili, The Cruel Theology of Ezekiel 20

External links 
 
 
 Prophet Ezekiel Orthodox icon and synaxarion

 
6th-century BC writers
Angelic visionaries
Christian saints from the Old Testament
Prophets in Christianity
Prophets of the Hebrew Bible
Tribe of Levi